Smt. Parmeshwaridevi Durgadutt Tibrewala Lions Juhu College of Arts, Commerce & Science (SPDT Lions Juhu College) is a higher education college located at Andheri, Mumbai. It was established in the year 1986. The college is affiliated to the University of Mumbai. Apart from teaching, research and publication activities, the college is best known for its academic and extracurricular events for students, teaching and non-teaching staff of the affiliated colleges of University of Mumbai.

Courses Offered 
 B.com, B.A, B.Sc. IT, Bachelor of Banking and Insurance (BBI), Bachelor of Financial Market (BFM), Bachelor of Management Studies(BMS)
 M.Com(Advance Accountancy), M.Com(Business Management), M.Sc. IT

References

External links 
 Official SPDT LJ college website

Universities and colleges in India
Universities and colleges in Mumbai